Olli Muotka (born 14 July 1988, in Rovaniemi) is a Finnish ski jumper and former Nordic combined athlete.

Before 2007 Muotka competed mainly in Nordic combined, in the Junior World Ski Championships and World Cup B competitions.

Since 2007 Muotka started to concentrate on ski jumping. In 2007 Junior World Ski Championships he finished eighth in the normal hill and won a bronze medal in the team competition. He made his Continental Cup debut in December 2007, his best result being a twelfth place from Zakopane in February 2008. He made his World Cup debut in January 2010 in Sapporo, collecting his first World Cup points with a fourteenth place.

Muotka earned a bronze in the team event at the FIS Ski-Flying World Championships 2010 in Planica.

References

1988 births
Living people
People from Rovaniemi
Finnish male Nordic combined skiers
Finnish male ski jumpers
Ski jumpers at the 2014 Winter Olympics
Olympic ski jumpers of Finland
Sportspeople from Lapland (Finland)